Avon Park High School (APHS) is a public high school in Avon Park, Florida, United States. It is part of The School Board of Highlands County.

Notable alumni 
 Dee Strange-Gordon, MLB player
 Tom Gordon, MLB player
 Deanie Parrish, air force pilot

References

External links 
 

Avon Park, Florida
High schools in Highlands County, Florida
Public high schools in Florida